K–12 (pronounced "K through twelve") is the second studio album by American singer Melanie Martinez. It was released with an accompanying film of the same name on September 6, 2019, through Atlantic Records. Martinez played the main character "Cry Baby" in this film that she wrote and directed.

Background
Martinez began writing the album in 2015. In a 2017 interview with Billboard, Martinez said that her then-untitled second album was finished and would be accompanied by a film that she was writing and directing. In a February 2019 Instagram post, she wrote that the album "had been done for like two and a half years now", that it would likely be released at the end of summer and that no singles would be commercially released before it. 

On January 7, 2020, Martinez announced through her Instagram stories that she would be releasing an EP titled After School that is attached to the K–12 era and released as the extended deluxe. She originally planned to release the project in the spring of 2020, but the project ended up coming out on 25 September 2020. Martinez also previously revealed that she has planned two more films, both of which will be accompanied by albums.

Promotion
A teaser video of Martinez in a pastel classroom was released on May 15, 2019. On May 16, she unveiled the album cover through her social media accounts. Martinez revealed the release date through Instagram on May 29.

On June 18, a TV spot was released, which included a snippet of "Nurse's Office". This was followed by weekly promotions, or "assignments", beginning in late June 2019, followed by snippets usually a few hours or a day later. Despite no singles being released from the album, Martinez released snippets along with respective animated videos for every song from the album to different location hotspots called "assignments," later uploading them to her social media and YouTube accounts.

On July 23, the official trailer for the K–12 film was released alongside the album tracklist and pre-order. It reveals some of the plot, while a snippet of "Show & Tell" plays at the end of the trailer. It also reveals that the film would be released in select theatres for one day only on September 5, 2019. Martinez will embark on the K-12 Tour in support of the album from October to December 2019, starting in Washington, D.C.

On September 25, 2020, Melanie Martinez released the After School EP, which was also included at the end of K–12 as a deluxe version of the album. "The Bakery" was released as the lead single from the EP, therefore becoming the first official single from K-12. This was following planned lead single from the album, "Lunchbox Friends", failing to be released as a single, and planned singles from After School, "Copycat" (with Tierra Whack) and "Fire Drill", failing to be included on the EP itself.

Promotional singles
Prior to the announcement that "Lunchbox Friends" would be the first official single from the album, Martinez pushed both "High School Sweethearts" and "Strawberry Shortcake" as promotional singles in July 2019 via vinyl release. She performed both tracks on Jimmy Kimmel Live!, alongside album track "Recess", on 16 September 2019, 10 days after the album release.

Music
K–12 was mostly produced by Michael Keenan, who had previously collaborated with Martinez on a few tracks on her previous album, Cry Baby. One track, "Drama Club", was co-written and produced by Martinez's frequent collaborators, Kinetics & One Love. A concept album, it has been described to be an alternative pop, dark pop, and art pop record.  Martinez's official website describes the album's sound as "a vibrant and singular melting pot of low-key hip-hop, soulful pop and indie-leaning electro". AllMusic also notes influences of hip hop and R&B.

Critical reception

In a positive review, Mike Wass from Idolator described the film as a "twisted pop musical". He praised the "seamless" integration of the album's music into the film's plot and compared the visuals to those found in Tim Burton and Wes Anderson's films, but described the content as "multi-layered, gritty and distinctly Melanie". He stated, "Melanie has created a cohesive, funny, empowering film from scratch—and also delivered 13 bops." and found "Wheels on the Bus" (which he described as an "earworm"), "High School Sweethearts" and "Lunchbox Friends" to be standout album tracks. He ended the review by advising the reader to "[watch] the film before listening to the album to get the full experience".

Commercial performance
Despite no singles being released prior to the album, K–12 debuted at number three on the US Billboard 200 with 57,000 album-equivalent units, of which 30,000 were pure album sales. It is Martinez's second US top-10 album and her highest charting album on the chart to date. Additionally it topped the alternative album chart becoming her second consecutive top charter. Elsewhere the album reached the top 10 of eight different countries including the UK, Australia and Canada.

Track listing

Notes
 The song "Fire Drill" appears during the end credits, but is not included in the album.
 "Wheels on the Bus" samples a children's song "The Wheels on the Bus" written by Verna Hills.
 "Brain & Heart" contains an interpolation of "If You Had My Love" by Jennifer Lopez.
 "Fire Drill" samples a children's song "Do Your Ears Hang Low?" written by George Washington Dixon

Charts

Weekly charts

Year-end charts

Certifications

Release history

Notes

References

2019 albums
Art pop albums
Atlantic Records albums
Concept albums
Melanie Martinez (singer) albums
Visual albums